Charles or Charlie Webb may refer to:

The Somerton Man, who has supposedly been identified as a man going by this name
Charles Webb (author) (1939–2020), American author
Charles Webb (architect) (1821–1898), architect working in Victoria, Australia
Charles Webb (Barbadian cricketer) (1830-1917), Barbadian cricketer
Charles Webb (English cricketer) (1874–1963), Middlesex cricketer 
Charles Webb (footballer) (1879–1939), English footballer with several clubs, including Leicester Fosse, Manchester City and Southampton
Charlie Webb (1886–1973), Ireland international footballer who played for and managed Brighton & Hove Albion
Chuck Webb (Charles Eugene Webb, born 1969), professional American football player 
Charles Henry Webb (1834–1905), American poet, author and journalist
Charles Harper Webb, American poet
Charles M. Webb (1833–1911), American politician
Charles Webb (born 1923), American professional baseball player; see 1949 Detroit Tigers season
Harry Webb (politician) (Charles Harry Webb, 1908–2000), Australian politician
Charles Herbert Webb, journalist with The China Press
Charles Webb (rugby league), New Zealand rugby league player
Charles V. Webb Jr. (1910–2010), American politician and lawyer from New Jersey
Charles Webb (chef), American chef and businessman